Joseph Bovshover (Yiddish: יוסף באָװשאָװער; Polish: Józef Bowszower; Russian: Иосиф Бовшовер; 1873–1915), also known as Yoysef Bovshover and under pseudonyms Basil Dahl and M. Turbov, was a Yiddish-language poet, essayist, and translator of Russian-Jewish descent. Emma Goldman described him as being a "high-strung and impulsive man of exceptional poetic gifts."

Selected works
 Poetishe verk (Yiddish: פּאָעטישע װערק; "Poetic works") (1903)
 Lider un gedikhte (Yiddish: לידער און געדיכטע; "Songs and poems") (1907)
 Bilder un gedanken (Yiddish: בילדער און געדאַנקען; "Pictures and ideas") (1907)
 Gezamlte shriftn: poezye un proze (Yiddish: געזאַמלטע שריפֿטן׃ פּאָעזיע און פּראָזע; "Collected writings: poetry and prose") (1911, reprinted in 1916)
 Shaylok (1911–1912)
 Geklibene lider (Yiddish: געקליבענע לידער; "Collected poems") (1918 and 1931)
 To the Toilers and Other Verses (1928)
 Lider (Yiddish: לידער; "Poems") (1930)
 Lider un dertseylungen (Yiddish: לידער און דערצײלונגען; "Poems and stories") (1939)

References

Further reading 

 https://www.encyclopedia.com/religion/encyclopedias-almanacs-transcripts-and-maps/bovshover-joseph
 https://blogs.bl.uk/european/2017/07/joseph-bovshover.html

1873 births
1915 deaths
People from Rudnyansky District, Smolensk Oblast
People from Orshansky Uyezd
Russian Jews
Jewish writers from the Russian Empire
Poets from the Russian Empire
Translators from the Russian Empire
Emigrants from the Russian Empire to the United States
American people of Russian-Jewish descent
American poets in Yiddish
Anarcho-communists
Jewish American writers
Jewish anarchists
Jewish poets
Jewish translators
Translators to Yiddish
Yiddish-language poets
American anarchists
American male poets
19th-century American male writers
19th-century American poets
20th-century American male writers
20th-century American poets